Parliamentary elections were held in the Republic of the Congo in July 2022, with the first round completed on 10 July. A second round was scheduled for 31 July in constituencies where no candidates were elected in the first round.

Electoral system
Members of the National Assembly are elected in single-member constituencies using the two-round system; if no candidate receives a majority of the votes in the first round, a run-off is held.

Results

First round 
It was reported that the ruling Congolese Party of Labour had won 102 of the 142 elected seats in the first round, enough for a supermajority on its own. They also had 14 candidates move on to a run-off. The Pan-African Union for Social Democracy won four seats in the first round, with four candidates moving on to a run-off. The Union of Humanist Democrats won three seats in the first round, with seven candidates moving on to a run-off.

Second round 
On 3 August, provisional results published by the Minister of Territorial Administration stated the Congolese Party of Labour had won a total of 111 seats between the two rounds. The Union of Humanist Democrats won four additional seats in their run-offs, bringing their total to seven, while the Pan-African Union for Social Democracy won three of their run-offs, also resulting in a total of seven seats. Turnout in both rounds was reported to be low, although no figure was published by election authorities.

Summary

References

Elections in the Republic of the Congo
Parliamentary
Congo
Congo
Election and referendum articles with incomplete results